Thaleria is a genus of sheet weavers that was first described by A. V. Tanasevitch in 1984.

Species
 it contains six species, found in Russia, the United States, and Alaska:
Thaleria alnetorum Eskov & Marusik, 1992 – Russia
Thaleria evenkiensis Eskov & Marusik, 1992 – Russia
Thaleria leechi Eskov & Marusik, 1992 – Russia, USA (Alaska)
Thaleria orientalis Tanasevitch, 1984 (type) – Russia
Thaleria sajanensis Eskov & Marusik, 1992 – Russia
Thaleria sukatchevae Eskov & Marusik, 1992 – Russia

See also
 List of Linyphiidae species (Q–Z)

References

Araneomorphae genera
Linyphiidae
Spiders of North America
Spiders of Russia